La Puebla de Cazalla is a city located in the province of Seville, Spain. According to the 2018 census (INE), the city has a population of 11,033 inhabitants.

References

External links
La Puebla de Cazalla - Sistema de Información Multiterritorial de Andalucía

Municipalities of the Province of Seville